Nanai Derek Sua (born 29 December 1987) is a Samoan judoka who has represented Samoa at the Pacific Games, Commonwealth Games, and Olympic Games.

He competed in the 2014 Commonwealth Games in Glasgow, but did not advance.

He was awarded with a wild card for the 2016 Summer Olympics in Rio de Janeiro, in the men's +100 kg, where he was eliminated by Abdullo Tangriev in the second round.

He won a gold medal at the 2017 OJU Senior Championships in Nukuʻalofa, Tonga. He won bronze at the 2019 Pacific Games in Apia.

References

External links 
 

1987 births
Living people
Samoan male judoka
Olympic judoka of Samoa
Commonwealth Games competitors for Samoa
Judoka at the 2016 Summer Olympics